Pennsylvania's elections were held on November 4, 2014. Primary elections were held on May 20, 2014.

All 203 seats of the Pennsylvania House of Representatives, 25 seats of the Pennsylvania Senate, as well as the Governor and Lieutenant Governor were up for election.

Pennsylvania Gubernatorial
2014 Pennsylvania gubernatorial election

Pennsylvania Lieutenant Gubernatorial
2014 Pennsylvania lieutenant gubernatorial election

Pennsylvania General Assembly
2014 Pennsylvania House of Representatives election
2014 Pennsylvania Senate elections

See Also:
United States House of Representatives elections in Pennsylvania, 2014

 
Pennsylvania